Sylvio or Silvio Paul Cator (October 19, 1900 – July 21, 1952) was a Haitian athlete most successful in the long jump.

Biography
Born in Cavaillon, Haiti, Cator was a footballer who played for the Trivoli Athletic Club and the Racing Club Haïtien. He participated in the 1924 Summer Olympics in Paris in the high jump, where he finished 15th, and the long jump, where he came in 12th. 

In the 1928 Summer Olympics in Amsterdam he won a silver medal in the long jump. His 7.58 m effort was 16 cm short of gold (Edward Hamm). A month later, on September 9, 1928, Sylvio Cator broke Edward Hamm's two-month-old world record with a 7.93 m jump at the 1924 Olympic stadium near Paris. He participated one more time in the long jump at the 1932 games in Los Angeles, where he took the 9th place.

As of 2021, his silver medal is the best result of a Haitian athlete in the Olympics, with only one other medal (bronze) for the Haitian free rifle team in the 1924 Olympics. His world record long jump is still (2021) the Haitian national record.

In 1946 Cator was elected Mayor of Port-au-Prince. Stade Sylvio Cator, a multi-use stadium in that city, was named after him and was finished in the year of his death in Port-au-Prince. In 1958, Haiti issued a series of seven stamps commemorating Cator's Olympic medal and world record 30 years before.

References

1900 births
1952 deaths
Haitian long jumpers
Haitian high jumpers
Olympic athletes of Haiti
Athletes (track and field) at the 1924 Summer Olympics
Athletes (track and field) at the 1928 Summer Olympics
Athletes (track and field) at the 1932 Summer Olympics
Olympic silver medalists for Haiti
World record setters in athletics (track and field)
Medalists at the 1928 Summer Olympics
Mayors of Port-au-Prince
Olympic silver medalists in athletics (track and field)
Haitian male athletes
Male long jumpers
Male high jumpers
People from Sud (department)